Koivukylä railway station is a Helsinki commuter rail station located in the district of Koivukylä in the city of Vantaa, Finland.

Connections
 K trains (Helsinki - Kerava)
 T trains (Helsinki - Riihimäki), nighttime

References

Railway stations in Vantaa
Railway stations opened in 1980